The Slow goby (Aruma histrio) is a species of goby fish endemic to the Gulf of California on the west coast of North America. This species grows to a maximum length of  SL. This species is the only known member of its genus.

Description 
It is brown with 6-7 white bars along its side, with some bars weak or missing. There is a narrow white bar at the base of its pectoral fin, followed by a dark brown bar. It is elongated and somewhat compressed. Its large head is flattened with swollen cheeks and a large mouth. It has a pore between its eyes, and two small pores on its preopercle. Its tail fin is long and rounded without scales or a lateral line.

Habitat 
The slow goby inhabits rocky crevices in tide pools and under cobble in shallow water. The larvae are usually found around sargassum. It needs a temperature of 20.8-23.8 degrees Celsius (69.4-74.8 degrees Fahrenheit). Adults are benthic.

References

External links
 Photograph

Gobiidae
Monotypic fish genera
Fish described in 1884
Taxa named by David Starr Jordan